Baqal may refer to:
Baqal, Iran
Baqal, United Arab Emirates